

Pitta is a genus of birds in the Pittidae, or pitta family. They are secretive, brightly coloured birds that forage on the forest floor. They are long-legged and short-tailed with rounded wings. They all have green on their upperparts with blue wing-patches. Many have dark heads. Nest construction, incubation and rearing of nestlings is performed by both parents. Incubation is completed in some 17 days, and the nestlings are altricial and nidicolous. Some species are migratory.

The antpittas, a Neotropical bird family of some 50 species, resemble the pittas in their hopping gait, furtive behaviour, long legs and short tails.

Taxonomy
The genus Pitta was erected by the French ornithologist Louis Jean Pierre Vieillot in 1816. In 1855 the English ornithologist George Robert Gray designated the type species as Corvus triostegus Sparrman. This is a junior synonym of Corvus brachyura Linnaeus, the Indian pitta. The word Pitta is from the Telugu language and means "pretty", "bauble" or "pet".

The genus contains 16 species, distributed from Africa, through southern, eastern and south-eastern Asia, to New Guinea, the Solomon Islands and Australia. It was formerly the sole genus in the family and contained 31 species. However, following a 2006 study, some of the species were split off into two resurrected genera, Erythropitta and Hydrornis, though all members of the family continue to be known as "pittas".

Species
The 14-16 species in the genus are:

Gallery

References

 
Bird genera
Taxa named by Louis Jean Pierre Vieillot
Articles containing video clips